The Ice Maiden's Sheikh is the ninth book in Alexandra Sellers's Sons of the Desert series, and was released in 2004. It features a parallel story to the one told in the previous book of the series, Sheikh's Castaway, as Princess Noor's cousin is left behind to answer her family's questions upon Noor's disappearance. This book follows the adventures of Jalia Shahbazi and Sheikh Latif Abd al Razzaq Shahin as they take off on search for Jalia's missing cousin. Jalia, like her cousin Noor, is another reluctant re-enthroned Bagestani princess who struggles to make sense of her ties to both Eastern and Western cultures.

Reviews
 Review at RT Book Reviews

References

External links
 The Ice Maiden's Sheikh on Author Website

British romance novels
2004 British novels
Harlequin books